Abena Osei-Poku, (née: Abena Osei), is a Ghanaian corporate executive who is the managing director and chief executive officer of Absa Bank Ghana (formerly Barclays Bank of Ghana). She has served in this role since September 2018. Before that, she worked at Absa in South Africa, where she was responsible for the Corporate & Investment Banking in East and West Africa, at the level of Managing Director.

Background and education
She was born in Ghana circa 1971. She attended Ghanaian elementary and secondary schools. She was admitted to the University of Ghana, graduating in 1994 with a Bachelor of Arts degree in Economics and Statistics. Later, she received a Master of Business Administration from the University of Manchester in the United Kingdom.

Career
She started her banking career at Standard Chartered Bank in 2002, working there for seven years. In 2009, she transferred to Barclays Bank. She spent part of the next nine years serving as an executive director at Barclays Bank Ghana and the rest of the time in South Africa, serving as an executive of the Barclays Africa Group, responsible for operations in Africa, outside of South Africa. In September 2018, she was appointed as the managing director of Barclays Bank of Ghana, replacing Patience Akyianu, who left the bank. In February 2020, Abena oversaw the transformation of Barclays Bank Ghana to Absa Bank Ghana.

Other considerations
She has in the past sat on the boards of several enterprises, including (a) Airtel Mobile Money Limited (b) Barclays Africa Group (c) United Kingdom and Ghana Chamber of Commerce and (d) Country Kitchen Limited.

As of October 2021, she is the chairperson of the advisory board of the College of Health Sciences at the University of Ghana.
She also serves as the vice chairperson of the board of the Ghana Stock Exchange, and is a member of the executive councils of the Ghana Association of Bankers and the National Banking College. In addition, she is an Honorary Fellow of the Chartered Institute of Marketing Ghana and an honorary member of the Chartered Institute of Bankers.

See also
 List of financial institutions in Ghana

References

External links
 ‘It Was Necessary’ – Barclays Bank MD Hails Banking Sector Cleanup As of 22 January 2020.
 Absa Bank MD, Abena Osei-Poku named one of Africa’s most influential female leaders As of 26 May 2021.

1971 births
Living people
Ghanaian bankers
21st-century Ghanaian businesswomen
21st-century Ghanaian businesspeople
Ghanaian chief executives
University of Ghana alumni
Alumni of the University of Manchester
Absa people
Ghanaian women business executives